Sitamarhi-Jaynagar-Nirmali Via Sursand Railway Line is a proposed railway line in East Central Railway zone by Indian Railway. It was announced by Former Railway Minister Lalu Prasad Yadav in 2007. He laid the foundation inauguration of this proposed railway line at Sursand on 5 January 2008. Its length is 188.9 km. This railway line will connect two districts of Bihar from Sitamarhi to Nirmali (Madhubani) via Sursand and Jaynagar. It also connects border areas of Nepal near Sitamarhi and Madhubani districts of Bihar. The cost of the project is Rs. 2,821.

References 

5 ft 6 in gauge railways in India
East Central Railway zone